The Reformed churches are a group of Protestant denominations connected by a common Calvinist system of doctrine.

Europe

Netherlands
The Dutch Calvinist churches have suffered numerous splits, and there have been some subsequent partial re-unions. Currently there are at least nine existing denominations, including (between brackets the Dutch abbreviation):
Protestant Church in the Netherlands (PKN) formed in 2004 from the union of
the Dutch Reformed Church (NHK),
the Reformed Churches in the Netherlands (GKN),
and the Evangelical Lutheran Church in the Kingdom of the Netherlands (ELK);
a notable Calvinist group within the PKN is the Reformed Association
Christian Reformed Churches (CGK)
Reformed Churches in the Netherlands (Liberated) (GKV)
Netherlands Reformed Churches (NGK)
Reformed Congregations (GG)
Old-Reformed Congregations in the Netherlands (OGGiN)
Old-Reformed Congregations (unconnected)
Reformed Congregations in the Netherlands (GGiN)
Reformed Congregations in the Netherlands (unconnected)
Restored Reformed Church (HHK)
Continued Reformed Churches in the Netherlands (VGKN)
Korean Reformed Church in the Netherlands
Reformed Churches in the Netherlands (Restored)
Covenant of Free Evangelical Congregations in the Netherlands - member of the World Communion of Reformed Churches
Moluccan Evangelical Church (GIM)
Indonesian Christian Church in the Netherlands (GKIN)
Since the Reformation, the Netherlands, as one of the few countries in the world, could be characterised as a mainly Calvinist state. Until the first half of the 20th century, a majority of the Dutch (about 55%) were Calvinist and a large minority (35-40%) were Catholic. Because of large-scale secularisation during the 20th century, these percentages dropped dramatically. Today only 15-20% of the Dutch (about 2.5 million people) is Calvinist, while 25-30% is Catholic. About 45% is non-religious. Today many orthodox Calvinist Christians in the Netherlands cooperate with Evangelicals in organizations such as the 'Evangelische Omroep' (Evangelical Broadcasting Company), the 'Evangelische Hogeschool' (Evangelical College), and the political party 'ChristenUnie' (ChristianUnion)

Dutch emigrants and missionaries brought Calvinist churches to many other countries outside Europe, including Canada, United States, South Africa, Indonesia, Australia and New Zealand.

Switzerland
The Swiss Reformed Churches were started in Zurich by Huldrych Zwingli and spread within a few years to Basle (Johannes Oecolampadius), Berne (Berchtold Haller and Niklaus Manuel), St. Gall (Joachim Vadian), to cities in Southern Germany and via Alsace (Martin Bucer) to France. After Zwingli's early death in 1531, his work was continued by Heinrich Bullinger, the author of the Second Helvetic Confession. The French-speaking cities Neuchatel, Geneva and Lausanne changed to the Reformation ten years later under William Farel and John Calvin coming from France. The Zwingli and Calvin branches each had their theological distinctions, but in 1549, under the lead of Bullinger and Calvin, they came to a common agreement in the Consensus Tigurinus (Zurich Consent), and 1566 in the Second Helvetic Confession. Organizationally, the Reformed Churches in Switzerland remained separate units until today (the Reformed Church of the Canton Zurich, the Reformed Church of the Canton Berne, etc.), the German part more in the Zwingli tradition, in the French part more in the Calvin tradition. Today they are members of the Federation of Swiss Protestant Churches. They are governed synodically and their relation to the respective canton (in Switzerland, there are no church-state regulations on country-level) ranges from independent to close collaboration, depending on historical developments. A distinctive of the Swiss Reformed churches in Zwingli tradition is their historically almost symbiotic link to the state (cantons) which is only loosening gradually in the present.

There are a small number of conservative churches like the Evangelical Reformed Church (Westminster Confession) and the Lausanne Free Church.

A total of 2.4 million Swiss are members of Calvinist churches, according to the 2000 census, which corresponds with 33% of the population. The past decades show a rapid decline in this proportion, coming from 46% in 1970.

Hungary
The Reformed Church in Hungary, Transylvania and southern Slovakia is one of the largest branches of the Calvinist movement. The Reformed Church is the second largest church in Hungary, it has 4 seminaries in the country (Debrecen, Papa, Budapest, Sarospatak). The Hungarian Reformed Church adopted the Heidelberg Catechism and the Second Helvetic Confession as a definition of their teaching, together the Ecumenical creeds of the Christian Church: Athanasian Creed, Nicene Creed, Chalcedon, and the common creed ("Apostles' Creed"). The Hungarians organised the Calvinist church in 1557 in the Synod of Csenger and adopted the Second Helvetic Confession in 1567 in Debrecen.

The Hungarian Reformed Church maintains educational institutions, almost 80 primary schools, 28 high schools, 47 nurseries and several vocational schools and the Bethesda Hospital. There are diaconal institutions and conference centres.

In 2001, more than 1.6 million people in Hungary identified as members of the Hungarian Reformed Church. Of that number, about 600,000 are considered active members, in 1,249 congregations. The HRC has 27 presbyteries, four districts and a General Synod. In Romania, 700,000 people identified as Calvinist in 800 congregations, nearly all of them ethnic Hungarians living in Transylvania.

There is the more theologically conservative Reformed Presbyterian Church of Central and Eastern Europe, which has approximately 25 congregations in Hungary, Slovakia, Romania and Ukraine. Like the mainline Hungarian Reformed church, from which it split in 1997, the church adheres to the Second Helvetic Confession and the Heidelberg Catechism, but it has also adopted the Westminster Confession, and Shorter and Larger Catechisms.

The Reformed Presbyterian Church of Central and Eastern Europe maintains the Károlyi Gáspár Institute of Theology and Missions, located in Miskolc, Hungary.

There is a mission church of the Communion of Reformed Evangelical Churches in Diósd, near Budapest.

Slovakia 
Reformed Christian Church in Slovakia was part of the Reformed Church in Hungary until the end of World War I. In 1993, a theological seminary was opened in Komárno. Cathechial schools are in Kosice and Komarno. In Slovakia, 110,000 Calvinists were recorded.

Romania 
The Reformed Church in Romania consist of two dioceses. These are:

Reformed Diocese of Királyhágómellék
Reformed Diocese of Transylvania

In Transylvania, the Calvinist faith took root in the 16th century. In 1564, a Synod was held in Nagyenyed (today Aiud) when the Calvinist and Lutheran churches separated. This date is the founding date of the Reformed Diocese of Transylvania. Partium (today partially Crișana) used to be a separated geographical area from Transylvania, also ruled by Hungarian/Transylvanian princes. In this region was founded the Királyhágómellék Reformed District. Transylvania was part of Hungary until 1920. The Confessions of these churches are the Apostles Creed, the Heidelberg Catechism. In the church buildings, especially in smaller villages, the men and women sitting separated and the children and those who were not yet married were sitting in the church choir or gallery. The believers are predominantly (95%) Hungarian, so the worship language is also Hungarian. It has 800 congregations and 700,000 members.

Evangelical Reformed Church of Romania

A Romanian mission of the United Reformed Churches in North America was founded in Bucharest in 2016.

Germany
The German Reformed Church (Reformierte Kirche) forms, together with German Lutheran and united Protestant churches, the umbrella named Evangelical Church in Germany (German: Evangelische Kirche in Deutschland) or EKD. The member churches of EKD were formerly the Protestant state churches in German states before the separation of religion and state in 1919. EKD represents, alongside Catholicism, Germany's "mainstream" religious bodies.

The German Reformed Church, unusually, does not trace its origins back to Zwingli or Calvin, but rather to Philipp Melanchthon, Luther's best friend and closest ally. After Melanchthon's death in 1560, extremist Lutherans (from whom Luther had previously distanced himself) accused Melanchthon's successors in the "Philippist" cause of Crypto-Calvinism and mercilessly persecuted and sometimes killed them in several states, especially Saxony. Other states, such as Hesse(-Cassel), remained openly Philippist and Calvinist. Only during the time of Calvin (1509–1564) himself did genuinely Calvinist influences enter the German Calvinist faith; even today, it remains more Philippist than Calvinist.

In the German Empire (1871–1918) some states were Lutheran, some Reformed. King Frederick William III of Prussia united both major Protestant confessions in his domains into the Prussian Union of churches in 1817, allowing congregations to maintain Lutheran or Calvinist confession, or declare their union, also in Bremen (1877), Hesse-Cassel (1817), and Hesse-Darmstadt (1832) Reformed and Lutherans form a union merely in administration. Some states saw unions of Reformed and Lutherans to a united confession, such as Anhalt (1820 in Anhalt-Bernburg, 1827 in Anhalt-Dessau, and 1880 in Anhalt-Köthen), Baden (1821), Nassau (1817) and Bavarian Palatinate (1848), while Lutherans in other states (Bavaria proper, Hamburg, Hanover, Lübeck, the Mecklenburgs, Oldenburg, Saxon Duchies, Saxony, Schaumburg-Lippe, Schleswig-Holstein, and Württemberg) did not followed suit.

The German Reformed Church's finest hour arguably occurred during the Third Reich (1933–1945): although by far not all Calvinist clergy and their flocks opposed the Nazis, the Reformed Church dominated the Confessing Church resistance against Hitler.

As of 2009, German Protestants come in four different guises, all under one national umbrella, but differentiated by region (Landeskirche, usually regions smaller than the states):

Lutheran
Calvinist, namely Evangelical Reformed Church in Bavaria and Northwestern Germany (comprising Reformed congregations in all areas, where Lutherans and Reformed did not unite, but Lippe), and Church of Lippe
Administration-United - in these churches, each parish is either Lutheran, Reformed or united Protestant, and so is the congregation and the Pastor, but all share the same administration
Consensus-United - there is no difference even at the parish level

In Germany, as of 2009, roughly 25 million Germans (less than one-third of the entire population, slightly more than half of German Christians) are Protestant. Of these, less than 2 million are Calvinist. The main coordinating body for Calvinist churches in Germany is the Reformed Alliance.

Smaller, separate denominations include the Evangelical Old-Reformed Church in Lower Saxony, the Union of Evangelical Reformed Churches in Germany, and the episcopally governed Free Reformed Churches of Germany.

France
In France, the Calvinist Protestants were called Huguenots. The Reformed Church of France survived under persecution from 1559 until the Edict of Nantes (1598), the effect of which was to establish regions in which Protestants could live unmolested. These areas became centers of political resistance under which the Calvinist church was protected until 1628, when La Rochelle, the Protestant center of resistance to Louis XIII, was overrun by a French army blockade. After the Protestant resistance failed, the Reformed Church of France reorganized, and was guaranteed toleration under the Edict of Nantes until the final revocation of toleration in 1685 (Edict of Fontainebleau). The periods of persecution scattered French Reformed refugees to England, Germany, Switzerland, Netherlands, Africa (especially South Africa) and America. Louis XVI granted an edict of toleration. Freedom of religion came with the French Revolution. Napoleon organized state controlled French Reformed church with the Organic Articles in 1802. A free (meaning, not state controlled) synod of the Reformed Church emerged in 1848 and survives in small numbers to the present time. The French refugees established French Reformed churches in the Latin countries and in America.

The first Calvinist churches in France produced the Gallic Confession and French Calvinist confession of faith, which served as models for the Belgic Confession of Faith (1563).

Today, about 300,000 people are members of the Reformed Church of France (now United Protestant Church of France). There is also the smaller Protestant Reformed Church of Alsace and Lorraine and the more conservative National Union of Independent Reformed Evangelical Churches of France (the name of the denomination was changed in 2009).

The Malagazy Protestant Church in France is a Calvinist denomination whose members come from Madagascar.
The Union of Free Evangelical Churches in France is another denomination.

Great Britain and Ireland
The churches with Presbyterian traditions in the United Kingdom have the Westminster Confession of Faith as one of their important confessional documents.
United Reformed Church (URC) in the United Kingdom is the result of the union of Presbyterian, Congregational and Church of Christ churches
Several hundred Congregational churches opted to remain outside the initial 1972 union, forming the Evangelical Fellowship of Congregational Churches and the Congregational Federation. Some congregations were gathered into the Fellowship of Independent Evangelical Churches whilst others are now wholly independent without any national affiliation.
The Evangelical Presbyterian Church in England and Wales has currently 17 congregations
The International Presbyterian Church has English and Korean congregations in Great Britain and missions in Romania, Italy and Armenia and in other parts of the world.
Metropolitan Tabernacle-a famous independent Reformed Baptist congregation pastored by Spurgeon -not a denomination

In Wales, there are the Union of Welsh Independents, which is another congregational body. The Presbyterian Church of Wales is one of the biggest Christian denomination in Wales.

In Scotland, presbyterianism was established in 1560 by John Knox who studied in Geneva and planted Calvinism in his home country. The presbyterian churches in the US, Canada, Australia trace their origin back primarily from Scotland.
The Presbyterian churches in Scotland, including:
The Church of Scotland, the established, national church in Scotland
Free Church of Scotland
Free Church of Scotland (Continuing)
United Free Church of Scotland
Free Presbyterian Church of Scotland
Reformed Presbyterian Church of Scotland
Associated Presbyterian Churches

In Ulster, Northern Ireland and The Republic of Ireland spread the Calvinist faith in the 17th century.
The Reformed Presbyterian Church of Ireland
The Presbyterian Church in Ireland serves the whole of the island
There are also other churches with smaller flocks, notably in Northern Ireland
The Free Presbyterian Church of Ulster
The Evangelical Presbyterian Church in Ireland
Non-subscribing Presbyterian Church of Ireland
Congregational Union of Ireland

A group of churches called Newfrontiers began in England and also exists elsewhere in the world. This group tends to hold to Calvinist theology, but is also charismatic in its experience.

Anglicanism
Historically, the Church of England upheld both Lutheran and Calvinist doctrines. Several continental Calvinist theologians moved to England to aid with the doctrinal and liturgical developments there, including Martin Bucer, Peter Martyr, and Jan Łaski. Especially Calvinistic distinctions of the Church of England include the division of the Ten Commandments after the Calvinist numbering (rather than the Lutheran or Catholic division), the iconoclastic reforms of Edward VI and Elizabeth I, and the Eucharistic doctrine of Receptionism. The Church of England so took part in the Synod of Dort, and monarchs since the Glorious Revolution have sworn in the coronation oath to protect the “true profession of the Gospel, and the Protestant Reformed religion established by law.”

However, the ascendency of William Laud to the archbishopric saw a periodic suppression of pro-Calvinist clergymen under Charles I, and the Oxford Movement of the 19th century sought to further distance the Church of England from its Calvinistic ties. Because of the political success of Anglo-Catholicism there have been a few conservative Reformed movements which have left the Church of England:

The Free Church of England
The Countess of Huntingdon's Connexion
The Church of England (Continuing)

Greece 
Greek Evangelical Church
Congregational Churches in Greece https://www.internationalcongregationalfellowship.org/our-regions/

Croatia 
Reformed Christian Church in Croatia was part of the Hungarian Reformed Church. It is a member of the World Communion of Reformed Churches.
Protestant Reformed Christian Church in Croatia

Italy
 The Waldensian Evangelical Church
It is an Italian historical Protestant denomination. After Protestant Reformation, the small church absorbed Calvinist theology - under the influence of Guillaume Farel- and became the Italian branch of the European Calvinist churches.
In 1975, the Waldensian Church (45,000 members circa, plus some 15,000 affiliates in Argentina and Uruguay) joined forces with the Italian Methodist Church (5,000) to form the Union of Methodist and Waldensian Churches. It is member of both the World Alliance of Reformed Churches and of the World Methodist Council, due to its nature of a united church.

 The Evangelical Reformed Baptist Churches in Italy 
It is a Reformed Baptist denomination in Italy. As a member of the World Reformed Fellowship, this network of churches recover the Calvinist tradition of Pietro Martire Vermigli and Girolamo Zanchi.

The Presbyterian Church in Italy 
It is a mission of the Presbyterian Church of Brazil in Italy.

Ukraine 
Reformed Church in Transcarpathia
It is the oldest Protestant community in Ukraine, established during the 16th century. 70-75% of Transcarpathian Hungarians are followers of the Calvinist faith. The church currently has three dioceses with about 120,000 - 140,000 members and is itself a member of the World Communion of Reformed Churches.
Union of Evangelical Reformed Churches in Ukraine
Evangelical Reformed Church in Transcarpathia
Evangelical Presbyterian Church of Ukraine
This church was started by missionaries of the Presbyterian Church in America and has 12 congregations and missions with 11 ordained national pastors; it maintains a Calvinist seminary in Kyiv.

Serbia 
Reformed Christian Church in Serbia was also part of The Reformed Church in Hungary till 1920
Protestant Reformed Christian Church in Serbia

Sweden 
Mission Covenant Church of Sweden
Evangelical Reformed Church in Sweden

Slovenia 
Reformed Church in Slovenia

Poland 
Polish Reformed Church
Confederation of Reformed Evangelical Churches in Poland

Bulgaria 
Union of Evangelical Congregational Churches in Bulgaria

Denmark 
Reformed Synod of Denmark
German Reformed of Copenhagen
Reformed Congregation in Fredericia

Belgium 
United Protestant Church in Belgium

Spain 
Spanish Evangelical Church
Reformed Churches in Spain
Evangelical Presbyterian Church in Spain

Lithuania 
Synod of the Evangelical Reformed Church in Lithuania

Czech Republic 
Evangelical Church of Czech Brethren
Church of the Brethren in the Czech Republic or Evangelical Brethren Church in the Czech Republic - Czech Republic and Slovakia

Portugal 
Evangelical Reformed Church in Portugal
Evangelical Presbyterian Church in Portugal
Christian Presbyterian Church in Portugal
Union of Evangelical Congregational Churches in Portugal
Renewed Presbyterian Church in Portugal - mission of the Renewed Presbyterian Church in Brazil
St. Andrews Church, Church of Scotland in Lisbon

Latvia 
Reformed Church in Latvia

Luxemburg 
Protestant Church of Luxembourg
Protestant Reformed Church of Luxembourg

Austria 
Reformed Church in Austria
Evangelical Reformed Church (Westminster Confession)

Liechtenstein 
Evangelical Church in Liechtenstein

Cyprus 
Greek Evangelical Church
Trinity Community Christian Fellowship in Larnaca, Cyprus

Russia 
Communion of Reformed Evangelical Churches in Eurasia
Reformed Fundamental Church in Russia
Union of Evangelical Reformed Churches in Russia
Hundreds of Presbyterian Congregations are existing in Russia, which are the fruit of the Korean Presbyterian denominations from South Korea.

Belarus 
Belarusian Evangelical Reformed Church

Macedonia 
Union of Evangelical Congregational Churches in Macedonia

Finland 
Christ Church of Oulu

Albania 
Reformed Church in Durrës mission of the PCA
Emmanuel reformed church in Tirana

Azerbaijan 
International Presbyterian Church, Baku

Armenia 
Congregational Churches in Armenia https://www.internationalcongregationalfellowship.org/our-regions/

Norway 
First Presbyterian Church of Norway https://fpcnorway.org/

Oceania

Australia

Australian Free Church
Christian Reformed Churches of Australia
Evangelical Presbyterian Church
EV Church
Free Presbyterian Church (Australia)
Free Reformed Churches of Australia
Hungarian Reformed Church in Australia
Presbyterian Church of Australia (Presbyterian)
Presbyterian Church of Eastern Australia (Presbyterian - Free)
Presbyterian Reformed Church (Australia) (Presbyterian Reformed)
Reformed Presbyterian Church of Australia (part of the Reformed Presbyterian Church (denominational group))
Southern Presbyterian Church
Uniting Church in Australia (Presbyterian, Methodist and Congregationalist)
Westminster Presbyterian Church of Australia

Congregational churches 
Congregational Federation of Australia
Uniting Church in Australia
Fellowship of Congregational Churches

American Samoa 
Congregational Christian Church in American Samoa

Cook Island 
Cook Islands Christian Church

Fiji 
St. Andrews Presbyterian Church in Fiji

French Polynesia 
Maóhi Protestant Church
New Evangelical Reformed Church
Protestant Reformed Church in French Polynesia
Independent Church of French Polynesia
Christian Church in French Polynesia

Marshall Islands 
United Church of Christ-Congregational in the Marshall Islands
Reformed Congregational Churches (Marshall Islands)

Micronesia 
Namoneas Congregational Church in Chuuk
United Church of Christ in Kosrae
United Church of Christ in Pohnpei

New Caledonia 
Evangelical Church in New Caledonia and the Loyalty Islands
Free Evangelical Church

New Zealand
Reformed Churches of New Zealand
Presbyterian Church of Aotearoa New Zealand (Presbyterian)
Grace Presbyterian Church of New Zealand (Presbyterian)
Fellowship of Reformed Baptist Churches in New Zealand
Free Presbyterian Church of Scotland - Australia and New Zealand Presbytery
Congregational Union of New Zealand

Kiribati 
Kiribati Protestant Church

Nauru 
Nauru Congregational Church

Niue 
Church of Niue

Solomon Islands 
United Church in the Solomon Islands

Tuvalu 
Church of Tuvalu

Vanuatu 
Presbyterian Church in Vanuatu
Presbyterian Reformed Church in Vanuatu

Western Samoa 
Congregational Christian Church in Samoa

North America

Presbyterians 
American Presbyterian Church (founded 1979)
Associate Reformed Presbyterian Church (Scots-Irish Presbyterians)
Bible Presbyterian Church (1937 from the OPC)
Covenant Presbyterian Church
Covenant Reformed Presbyterian Church
Covenanting Association of Reformed and Presbyterian Churches
Cumberland Presbyterian Church
Cumberland Presbyterian Church in America
ECO: A Covenant Order of Evangelical Presbyterians
Evangel Presbytery
Evangelical Assembly of Presbyterian Churches in America
Evangelical Presbyterian Church
Faith Presbytery, Bible Presbyterian Church
Free Church of Scotland - has about 9 congregations in North America
Free Church of Scotland (Continuing) - has 7 congregations in North America
Free Presbyterian Church of North America
Korean-American Presbyterian Church
Korean Evangelical Presbyterian Church in America
Korean Presbyterian Church Abroad
Korean Presbyterian Church in America (Kosin)
Orthodox Presbyterian Church
Presbyterian Church in America
The PCA is the second largest Presbyterian denomination in the United States, after the PC(USA). Its motto is: "Faithful to the Scriptures, True to the Reformed Faith and Obedient to the Great Commission of Jesus Christ."
Presbyterian Church in Canada
The Presbyterian Church in Canada, formed in June 1875, as a union of 4 Presbyterian groups in the Dominion of Canada (created in 1867); These "Continuing Presbyterians", did not join the United Church of Canada in 1925, of Presbyterians, along with Methodists, Congregationalists, and Union Churches.
Presbyterian Church (U.S.A.)
Most Presbyterian churches adhere to the Westminster Confession of Faith, but the Presbyterian Church (U.S.A.), in order to embrace the historical expressions of the whole Reformed tradition as found in the United States, has adopted a Book of Confessions which includes the Westminster Confession of Faith.
Presbyterian Reformed Church (North America)
Reformed Presbyterian Church General Assembly (1990 from the RPCUS)
Reformed Presbyterian Church - Hanover Presbytery
Reformed Presbyterian Church of North America (RPCNA, Scottish Covenanters)
Upper Cumberland Presbyterian Church separated from the Cumberland Presbyterian Church
Vanguard Presbytery

Continental Reformeds 

Alliance of Reformed Churches(founded 2021 out of the RCA)
Calvin Synod (United Church of Christ)
Canadian and American Reformed Churches (Dutch Reformed - Liberated)
Christian Reformed Church in North America (Dutch Reformed - GKN)
Free Reformed Churches in North America - (Dutch Reformed - CGKN)
French Protestant (Huguenot) Church, Charleston, SC——The only French Calvinist or Huguenot congregation still existing in the United States.
Heritage Netherlands Reformed Congregations
Hungarian Reformed Church in America
Kingdom Network (inaugurating September 9, 2021 out of the RCA)
Lithuanian Evangelical Reformed Church in America
Netherlands Reformed Congregations
 Associated with the Dutch Reformed (Gereformeerde Gemeenten (Dutch)) churches in the Netherlands.
Protestant Reformed Churches in America (Dutch Reformed - GKN)
One of the most conservative of all Reformed/Calvinist denominations, the PRCA separated from the Christian Reformed Church in the 1920s in a schism over the issue of common grace.
Reformed Congregations in North America
Reformed Church in the United States (German Reformed)
The majority of the original Reformed Church in the United States, which was founded in 1725, merged with Evangelical Synod of North America (a mix of German Reformed & Lutheran theologies) to form the Evangelical and Reformed Church in 1940 (which would merge with the Congregational Christian Churches in 1957 to form the United Church of Christ) leaving the Eureka Classis serving as a Continuing church of the Reformed Church in the United States until 1986, when it was dissolved to form the Synod of the Reformed Church in the United States
Reformed Church in America
The Reformed Church in America (RCA) is the oldest Dutch Reformed denomination in the United States, dating back from the mid-17th century 
Reformed Church of Quebec
United Reformed Churches in North America (Dutch Reformed - GKN)

Congregational 

Congregational Christian Churches in Canada

Reformed Anglicans 

Anglican Mission in the Americas
Reformed Anglican Church
Reformed Episcopal Church

Reformed Baptist 

Association of Reformed Baptist Churches of America
Fellowship of Independent Reformed Evangelicals

Others 

Communion of Reformed Evangelical Churches
Puritan Reformed Church
Newfrontiers in the United States
Sovereign Grace Churches (Credobaptist, charismatic)

Asia

Bangladesh 
Bangladesh Reformed Baptist Church
Church of Bangladesh
Presbyterian Church of Bangladesh
Peace Church Bangladesh
Grace Presbyterian Church in Bangladesh
Smyrna House of Prayer Church in Bangladesh
Sylhet Presbyterian Synod
Korean Presbyterian Church in Bangladesh
Evangelical Reformed Presbyterian Church in Bangladesh
Hill Tracts Presbyterian Kawhmi
Bangladesh Bible Presbyterian Church

Cambodia 
Presbyterian Church in Cambodia
Evangelical Fellowship in Cambodia

China 
Church of Christ in China

East Timor 
Protestant Church in East Timor
Evangelical Presbyterian Church of East Timor

Japan 
Evangelical Reformed Church in Japan
United Church of Christ in Japan
Church of Christ in Japan
Reformed Church in Japan
Presbyterian Church in Japan
Reformed Presbyterian Church in Japan
Japan Presbytery - Cumberland Presbyterian Church
Japan Presbytery - Reformed Presbyterian Church in North America
Korean Christian Church in Japan
The Biblical Church

Republic of South Korea
Most Presbyterian denominations share same name, the Presbyteian Church in Korea, tracing back their history to the United Presbyterian Assembly. There are 15 million Protestants in South Korea, about 9 millions are Presbyterians and there are more than 100 Presbyterian denominations. Before the Korean War Presbyterians were very strong in North Korea, many fled to South, and established their own Presbyterian denominations. The Presbyterian Churches are by far the largest Protestant churches with well over 20 000 congregations. For more information see Presbyterianism in South Korea.

Presbyterian Church in Korea (Koshin) (Kosin 고신). The PCK is a Reformed denomination in Korea which accepts the Westminster standards as its confession. The church also recognizes "Three Forms of Unity", to be same as the Westminster Standards. Kosin church wants to be a biblical and confessional denomination, pure in doctrine and life. There are about 2,000 local churches, including some churches in North America and Europe.
The Presbyterian Church in Korea (HapDong) The (Hapdong 합동) group was formed the primary body of the Presbyterian General Assembly (the Reformed Church in Korea) was established by missionaries of the Presbyterian Church (USA), and Canadian and Australian Presbyterians. For more information see Presbyterianism in Korea
The Independent Reformed Church in Korea (IRC) was established in 1964, independently from other denominations. IRC is the first church in Korea to put "reformed" in her name. IRC confesses the Westminster Standards, Heidelberg Catechism, and Canons of Dordt together with the ecumenical creeds.
Presbyterian Church in Korea (GaeHyuk)
Presbyterian Church in Korea (TongHap) - it is the second largest Presbyterian church in Korea. An ecumenical church body, member of the World Council of Churches. It was founded in 1884 by missionaries from the United States and Canada.
Orthodox Presbyterian Church of Korea-OPCK(Founder. Ha Seung-moo) is a historic Orthodox Reformed Church's doctrine and historical succession of tradition of the John Knox's <Scottish Presbyterian Church> declared the first among Presbyterian denomination in Korea. Launched in January 2012.
Presbyterian Church in the Republic of Korea - the church was formed in 1953 and has about 350 000 members
Presbyterian Church in Korea (HapDongChongShin)
Presbyterian Church in Korea (ChanYang)
Presbyterian Church in Korea (JaeGun)
Presbyterian Church in Korea (HapDongChunTong)
Presbyterian Church in Korea (HapDongBoSu)
Presbyterian Church in Korea (HapDongBoSu I.)
Presbyterian Church in Korea (BupTong)
Presbyterian Church in Korea (JangShin)
Presbyterian Church in Korea (Daeshin)
Presbyterian Church in Korea (BoSuHapDong)
Presbyterian Church in Korea (YeJangHapBo)
Presbyterian Church in Korea (HyukShin)
Presbyterian Church in Korea (ChanYang)
Presbyterian Church in Korea (JapDongJungAng)
Conservative Presbyterian Church in Korea
Presbyterian Church in Korea (HwanWon)
Presbyterian Church in Korea (PyungAhn)
Presbyterian Church in Korea (SunGyo)
Presbyterian Church in Korea (NamBuk)
Presbyterian Church in Korea (JungAng)
Presbyterian Church in Korea (YunShin)
Presbyterian Church in Korea (KoRyuPa)
Presbyterian Church in Korea (DongShin)
Presbyterian Church in Korea (YeJong)
Presbyterian Church in Korea (BokUm)
Presbyterian Church in Korea (JungAng)
Presbyterian Church in Korea (JungRip)
Presbyterian Church in Korea (SungHapChuk)
Presbyterian Church in Korea (JeongRip)
Presbyterian Church in Korea (ChanYang)
Presbyterian Church in Korea (DokNoHoe)
Presbyterian Church in Korea (Logos)
Presbyterian Church in Korea (HapDongBokUm)
Presbyterian Church in Korea (BoSuTongHap)
Presbyterian Church in Korea (JeongTongChongHap)
Presbyterian Church in Korea (HapDongChungYun)
Presbyterian Church in Korea (HanGukBoSu)
Presbyterian Church in Korea (HapDongEunChong)
Presbyterian Church in Korea (HapDongJinRi)
Presbyterian Church in Korea (HapDongYunHap)
Presbyterian Church in Korea (HapDongYeChong)
Presbyterian Church in Korea (Ko-Ryu-Anti-Accusation)
Presbyterian Church in Korea (ChanYang)
Presbyterian Church in Korea (HapDongChongShin I.)
Presbyterian Church in Korea (HapDongChinShin II.)
Presbyterian Church in Korea (HapDongSeungHoe)
Presbyterian Church in Korea (YeJong)
Presbyterian Church in Korea (HapDongChongHoe)
Presbyterian Church in Korea (JeongTongGyeSeung)
Presbyterian Church in Korea (HapDongTongHap)
Presbyterian Church in Korea (DongShin)
Presbyterian Church in Korea (BoSuHapDong II.)
Presbyterian Church in Korea (HapDongSeungHoe)
Presbyterian Church in Korea (DaeShin II.)
Presbyterian Church in Korea (HapDongHwanWon)
Presbyterian Church in Korea (HapDongBoSu IV.)
Presbyterian Church in Korea (HapDongBoSu III.)
Presbyterian Church in Korea (HapDongBoSu II.)
Presbyterian Church in Korea (ChongHoe II.)
Presbyterian Church in Korea (BoSuHapDong III.)
Presbyterian Church in Korea (TongHapBoSu)
Presbyterian Church in Korea (DaeHanShinChuk)
Presbyterian Church in Korea (HapDongYeChong I)
Presbyterian Church in Korea (HapDongSeongHoe)
Presbyterian Church in Korea (GaeHyukHapDong I)
Presbyterian Church in Korea (GaeHyukHapDong II)
Presbyterian Church in Korea (HapDongGaeHyuk)
Presbyterian Church in Korea (HapDongJangShin)
Presbyterian Church in Korea (HoHun III)
Presbyterian Church in Korea (DaeShin II)
Presbyterian Church in Korea (ChongHoe II)
Presbyterian Church in Korea (ChongHoe I)
Presbyterian Church in Korea (HapDongYeChong I)
Presbyterian Church in Korea (GaeHyukHapDong III)
Presbyterian Church in Korea (DokNoHoe II)
Presbyterian Church in Korea (BoSuJeongTong)
Presbyterian Church in Korea (HapDongYeSun)
Independent Reformed Presbyterian Church in Korea
Korea Presbyterian Church
Union Presbyterian Church in Korea
United Presbyterian Church in Korea
Conservative Reformed Presbyterian Church in Korea
Women Pastors Presbyterian Church in Korea
Korea Jesus Presbyterian Church
Fundamentalist Presbyterian General Assembly in Korea
Korean Christian Fundamentalist Assembly
Korean Presbyterian Church (GaeHyuk I.)
Korean Presbyterian Church (HoHun)
Pure Presbyterian Church in Korea
Onnuri Community Church
SaRang Community Church

Hong Kong
The Hong Kong Council of the Church of Christ in China

India
Reformed Baptist Church, Vinukonda, Guntur Dt., Andhra Pradesh
Reformed Baptist Fellowship in India
The Malankara Mar Thoma Syrian Church of Malabar
St. Thomas Evangelical Church of India
Bible Presbyterian Church in India
Presbyterian Church of India
Presbyterian Church in India (Reformed)
Presbyterian Reformed Church in India
United Basel Mission Church
Reformed Presbyterian Church of India
Presbyterian Church in South India
Reformed Presbyterian Church North East India
Church of South India
Church of North India
Presbyterian Free Church of Central India
Evangelical Church of Maraland
Congregational Church in India
United Church of Northern India - Presbyterian Synod
South India Reformed Churches
Free Presbyterian Church, Kalimpong
Evangelical Presbyterian Church of Sikkim
Covenant Reformed Assemblies

Indonesia
Gereja Masehi Injili Halmahera (The Christian Evangelical Church in Halmahera)
Gereja Batak Karo Protestan ( Karo Batak Protestant Church)
Gereja Injili Indonesia (Indonesian Evangelical Church)
Gereja Jemaat Protestan di Indonesia (Protestant Congregations Church in Indonesia)
Gereja Kalimantan Evangelis (Evangelical Church in Kalimantan)
Gereja Kemah Injil Indonesia (Indonesian Gospel Tabernacle Church)
Gereja Kristen di Luwuk Banggai (Christian Church in Luwuk Banggai)
Gereja Kristen di Sulawesi Selatan (Christian Church in South Sulawesi)
Gereja Kristen Indonesia (Indonesian Christian Church)
Gereja Kristen Indonesia Sulawesi Selatan (Indonesian Christian Church of Sulawesi)
Gereja Kristen Injili Di Tanah Papua (Evangelical Christian Church of the Land of Papua)
Gereja Kristen Jawa (Javanese Christian Church)
Gereja Kristen Jawa Tengah Utara (Javanese Christian Church of Northern Central Java)
Gereja Kristen Jawi Wetan (The East Java Christian Church)
Gereja Kristen Kalam Kudus (Holy Word Christian Church)
Gereja Kristen Kalimantan Barat (West Kalimantan Christian Church)
Gereja Kristen Pasundan (Pasundan Christian Church)
Gereja Kristen Pemancar Injil (Gospel Propagating Christian Church)
Gereja Kristen Protestan di Bali (Protestant Christian Church in Bali)
Gereja Kristen Sulawesi Tengah (Christian Church in Central Sulawesi)
Gereja Kristen Sumatera Bagian Selatan (Christian Church of Southern Sumatra)
Gereja Kristen Sumba (Christian Church of Sumba)
Gereja Kristus (Church of Christ in Indonesia)
Gereja Kristus Tuhan (The Church of Christ the Lord)
Gereja Masehi Injili di Bolaang Mongondow (Christian Evangelical Church in Bolaang Mongondow)
GMIH (Evangelical Christian Church in Halmahera)
Gereja Masehi Injili di Minahasa (Christian Evangelical Church in Minahasa)
Gereja Masehi Injili di Timor (Christian Evangelical Church in Timor)
Gereja Masehi Injili Sangihe-Talaud (Christian Evangelical Church in Sangihe-Talaud)
Gereja Protestan di Indonesia Bagian Barat (Protestant Church in West Indonesia)
Gereja Protestan di Indonesia (Protestant Church in Indonesia)
Gereja Protestan di Sulawesi Tenggara (Protestant Church in Southeast Sulawesi)
Gereja Protestan Indonesia di Buol Toli-Toli (Indonesian Protestant Church in Buol Toli-Toli)
Gereja Protestan Indonesia di Gorontalo (Indonesian Protestant Church in Gorontalo)
Gereja Protestan Indonesia di Irjan Jaya (Indonesian Protestant Church in Irian Jaya)
Gereja Protestan Indonesia Donggala (Indonesian Protestant Church in Donggala)
Gereja Protestan Indonesia Luwu (Luwu Indonesian Protestant Church)
Gereja Protestan Kalimantan Barat (Protestant Church of West Kalimantan)
Gereja Protestan Maluku (Protestant Church in the Moluccas)
Gereja Reformed Injili Indonesia (Indonesian Reformed Evangelical Church)
Gereja Toraja (Toraja Church)
Gereja Toraja Mamasa (Toraja Mamasa Church)
Gereja-Gereja Kristen Indonesia Sumatera Utara (Indonesian Christian Church of North Sumatera)
Gereja-Gereja Masehi Musyafir (The Pilgrim's Churches)
Gereja-Gereja Reformasi Calvinis
Gereja-Gereja Reformasi di Indonesia (Reformed Churches in Indonesia - Irian Jaya)
Gereja-Gereja Reformasi di Indonesia (Reformed Churches in Indonesia - Nusa Tenggara Timur)
Gereja-Gereja Reformasi di Indonesia Kalimantan Barat (Reformed Churches in Indonesia - Kalimantan Barat)
Kerapatan Gereja Protestan Minahasa (Minahasa Protestant Church Assemblies)
(source: reformiert-online)

Kazakhstan 
Evangelical Reformed Church in Kazakhstan

Laos 
Lao Evangelical Church
Lao Presbyterian Church

Lebanon 
National Evangelical Synod of Syria and Lebanon
National Evangelical Union of Lebanon
Union of the Armenian Evangelical Churches in the Near East

Malaysia 
Presbyterian Church in Malaysia
Christ Evangelical Reformed Church
Reformed Baptist Churches Malaysia

Mongolia 
Presbyterian Church in Mongolia fruit of various Korean Presbyterian denominations

Myanmar 
Reformed Presbyterian Church in Myanmar
Presbyterian Church in Myanmar
United Reformed Church in Myanmar
Reformed Evangelical Church in Myanmar
Biblical Reformed Church in Myanmar
Evangelical Presbyterian Church of Myanmar
Christian Reformed Church in Myanmar
Independent Presbyterian Church in Myanmar
Mara Evangelical Church
Reformed Churches of Myanmar
Protestant Reformed Church in Myanmar
Free Reformed Church in Myanmar
Congregational Federation of Myanmar

Nepal 
Presbyterian Church in Nepal
Nepali Reformed Churches
Evangelical Presbyterian Church of Nepal
Free Presbyterian Church of Nepal
Aashish Presbyterian Free Church in Nepal

Pakistan 
Presbyterian Church of Pakistan
United Presbyterian Church of Pakistan
Associate Reformed Presbyterian Church in Pakistan
Church of Pakistan - Sialkot Diocese
 Sutlej Reformed Church of Pakistan

Philippines
Bastion of Truth Reformed Churches in the Philippines
Berean Protestant Reformed Church Philippines
Christian Reformed Church in the Philippines (Bread from Heaven Assemblies)
Protestant Reformed Church in Bulacan
United Covenant Reformed Church in the Philippines
Presbyterian Church of the Philippines
Reformed Churches in the Philippines (Dorthian Federation)
United Church of Christ in the Philippines
Cubao Reformed Baptist Church, Quezon City, Philippines
Iglesia Evangelica Unida de Cristo in the Philippines
Federation of Protestant Reformed Churches in the Philippines

Sri Lanka 
Christian Reformed Church in Sri Lanka
Lanka Reformed Church
Presbytery of Lanka
St. Andrew's Scots Church in Colombo, Sri Lanka
United Church Nuwara Eliya

Singapore
First Evangelical Reformed Church
Covenant Evangelical Reformed Church
Pilgrim Covenant Church
Life Bible Presbyterian Church
Bethany Independent-Presbyterian Church Singapore
Presbyterian Church in Singapore
Shalom Church (Reformed Baptist) Singapore
Bible Presbyterian Church in Singapore

Thailand 
Church of Christ in Thailand
Presbyterian Church of Thailand

Taiwan 
Presbyterian Church in Taiwan
Reformed Presbyterian Church in Taiwan
China Presbyterian Church
Taiwan Toa-Seng Presbyterian Church
The General Assembly of the Evangelical Presbyterian Church
Christian Reformed Church in Taiwan
Friendship Presbyterian Church in Taiwan

Turkey
Türkiye Protestan Reform Kiliseleri (Protestant Reformed Churches of Turkey) subscribes to Westminster Standards and the Three Forms of Unity
Antalya Protestant Church - subscribes the Westminster Standards -not a denomination

Vietnam 
Presbyterian Church of Vietnam
United Presbyterian Church of Vietnam
 God's Sovereignty in Vietnam. GSiV is not a denomination but a contact point for reformed work in Vietnam

Africa

Algeria 
Protestant Church of Algeria

Angola 
Presbyterian Church of Angola
Evangelical Reformed Church in Angola
Evangelical Congregational Church in Angola
United Evangelical Church in Angola
Independent Presbyterian Church in Angola
Renewed Presbyterian Church in Angola

Benin 
Confessional Reformed Church of Benin

Botswana 
Dutch Reformed Church in Botswana
United Congregational Church of Southern Africa

Burundi 
Egliese Protestante Reformee du Burundi

Burkina Faso 
Reformed Evangelical Church of Burkina Faso
Association of Evangelical Churches in Burkina Faso
Church of the Christian Alliance

Cameroon 
Presbyterian Church in Cameroon
Orthodox Presbyterian Church in Cameroon
Evangelical Church of Cameroon
Presbyterian Church of Cameroon
African Protestant Church

Central African Republic 
Protestant Church of Christ the King
Evangelical Church of Central Africa

Chad 
Evangelical Church of Chad

Democratic Republic of Congo 
Presbyterian Community in Congo
United Reformed Church in Congo
Church of Christ in Congo
Presbyterian Community in Kinshasa
Reformed Community of Presbyterians
Presbyterian Community in Eastern Kasai
Presbyterian Community in Western Kasai
Reformed Presbyterian Community in Africa
Evangelical Community of Kwango
Evangelical Community in Congo
Protestant Community of Shaba
Christian Reformed Church in Congo Eastern Africa
Community of Disciples of Christ
Reformed Church of the Faith in Congo

Republic of Congo 
Evangelical Church of Congo

Djibouti 
Protestant Church of Djibouti

Egypt 
Evangelical Church of Egypt (Synod of the Nile)
Armenian Evangelical Church

Equatorial Guinea 
Reformed Presbyterian Church of Equatorial Guinea

Eritrea 
Mehrete Yesus Evangelical Presbyterian Church in Asmara

Ethiopia 
Ethiopian Grace Reformed Church
 The Ethiopian evangelical church Bethel
Ethiopian Evangelical Church Mekane Yesus
Reformed Presbyterian Church in Ethiopia
Presbyterian church in Ethiopia
 Seventh day adventist church

Gabon 
Evangelical Church of Gabon
 Presbyterian church of Gabon

Gambia 
Canaan Christian Community Church in Gambia - Presbyterian Church in Korea (HapDong) - mission

Ghana 
Presbyterian Church of Ghana
Evangelical Presbyterian Church, Ghana
Grace Reformed Baptist Church, Haatso Ecomog, Accra

Guinea-Bissau 
Presbyterian Church in Guinea-Bissau - Brazilian mission

Ivory Coast 
Evangelical Presbyterian Church of Ivory Coast

Lesotho 
Lesotho Evangelical Church

Liberia 
Presbyterian Church in Liberia
Free Presbyterian Church in Liberia

Kenya 
Presbyterian Church of East Africa
Africa Evangelical Presbyterian Church
Reformed Church of East Africa
Africa Gospel Unity Church
Independent Presbyterian Church in Kenya
Bible Presbyterian Church in Kenya
Bible Christian Faith Church
Anglican Church of Kenya

Malawi 
Church of Central Africa Presbyterian - General Synod
Church of Central Africa Presbyterian - Livingstonia Synod (covers all of northern Malawi)
Church of Central Africa Presbyterian - Nkhoma Synod (Central Malawi)
Church of Central Africa Presbyterian - Blantyre Synod (southern Malawi)
Blackman's Church of Africa Presbyterian
Reformed Presbyterian Church of Malawi
Evangelical Presbyterian Church of Malawi
Renewed Presbyterian Church in Malawi

Madagascar
Church of Jesus Christ in Madagascar
Protestant Church of Ambohimazala-Firaisiana
Evangelical Indigenous Mission in Madagascar

Mauritius 
Presbyterian Church of Mauritius

Mozambique 
Presbyterian Church of Mozambique
United Church of Christ in Mozambique
Reformed Church in Mozambique
Reformed Church of Mozambique (Mphatso Synod)
Evangelical Church of Christ in Mozambique
Evangelical Church of Good Shepherd
Renewed Presbyterian Church in Mozambique
Mozambique Synod of the United Congregational Church in Southern Africa

Morocco 
Evangelical Church in Morocco

Namibia 
Afrikaans Protestant Church in Namibia
Reformed Churches in Namibia
Dutch Reformed Church in Namibia
Uniting Reformed Church in Southern Africa
Reformed Baptist Churches in Namibia
United Congregational Church of Southern Africa, Namibia Synod

Niger 
Evangelical Church of the Republic of Niger
Union of Evangelical Protestant Churches in Niger

Nigeria
Christian Reformed Church of Nigeria - (Dutch Reformed)
Reformed Church of Christ in Nigeria - (Dutch Reformed)
Presbyterian Church of Nigeria - (Scottish Presbyterian)
Qua Iboe Church - (Northern Irish non-denominational Reformed)
Church of Christ in the Sudan among the Tiv - (Dutch Reformed)
Evangelical Reformed Church of Christ - (Dutch Reformed)
Nigeria Reformed Church - (Dutch Reformed)
Church of Christ in Nigeria
United Church of Christ in Nigeria
Church of Nigeria  (mostly reformed)
N.K.S.T - Universal Reformed Christian Church of Nigeria
The various Reformed churches of Nigeria formed the Reformed Ecumenical Council of Nigeria in 1991 to further cooperation.

South Africa
Christian Reformed Church in South Africa
Evangelical Presbyterian Church in Southern Africa
Free Reformed Churches of South Africa
Reformed Churches in South Africa
Dutch Reformed Church in South Africa - NG Church
Nederduitsch Reformed Church in Africa - NH Church
Afrikaans Protestant Church of South Africa
Afrikaans Reformation Church, a small church with one congregation in Pretoria
Old Reformed Church
Uniting Presbyterian Church in Southern Africa
Church of England in South Africa (Reformed Anglican)
United Congregational Church in Southern Africa
Uniting Reformed Church in Southern Africa
Reformed Church in Africa, South Africa
Presbyterian Church of Africa
Free Church in Southern Africa
Volkskerk van Afrika
Sola 5 - formerly the Association of Reformed Baptist Churches
According to the census of 2001, more than 3.2 million people recorded themselves as Reformed. This however is fast decline compared to the 1996 census, when still 3.9 million people were Reformed. Particularly amongst black and coloured people the Reformed churches lost many members, while the number of Reformed whites remained status quo due to mass emigration.

Senegal 
Protestant Church in Senegal
Presbyterian Church of Senegal

Sierra Leone 
Presbyterian Church of Sierra Leone
Evangelical Presbyterian Church of Sierra Leone
Mount Zion Presbyterian Church of Sierra Leone
Christian Reformed Church in Sierra Leone

Swaziland 
Swaziland Reformed Church

Sudan 
Presbyterian Church in Sudan
Sudan Evangelical Presbyterian Church
Sudan Interior Church
Sudanese Reformed Churches
Sudanese Church of Christ
Africa Inland Church Sudan

Tanzania 
Shekinah Presbyterian Church of Tanzania
 Reformed Church of Tanzania

Uganda 
Presbyterian Church in Uganda
Reformed Presbyterian Church in Uganda
Evangelical Presbyterian Church in Uganda
Evangelical Free Church in Uganda
Christian Reformed Church in Eastern Africa
Calvary Reformed Church
New Life Presbyterian Church
Reformed Presbyterian Church in Africa (Uganda)
Reformed Baptist Church in Uganda
Anglican Church of Uganda
Grace Fellowship Church in Uganda

Reunion 
Protestant Church of Reunion Island

Rwanda 
Presbyterian Church in Rwanda
Reformed Presbyterian Church in Africa (Rwanda)
Anglican Church of Rwanda
 Reformed Church of Rwanda

Togo 
Evangelical Presbyterian Church of Togo

Tunisie 
Reformed Church in Tunisie

Zambia 
Reformed Church in Zambia
Church of Central Africa Presbyterian - Synod of Zambia
United Church in Zambia

Zimbabwe 
Church of Central Africa Presbyterian - Harare Synod
United Church of Christ in Zimbabwe
Dutch Reformed Church - Synod Central Africa
Reformed Church in Zimbabwe
United Congregational Church of Southern Africa
African Free Presbyterian Church of Zimbabwe
Free Presbyterian Church of Scotland in Zimbabwe
Presbyterian Church of Africa

Central America and the Caribbean

Bahamas 
St. Andrews Presbyterian Kirk in Nassau

Bermuda 
Christ Church in Warwick
St. Andrew's Presbyterian Church in Bermuda

Belize 
Presbyterian Church of Belize

Costa Rica 
Christian Reformed Church in Costa Rica
Korean Presbyterian Church in Costa Rica
Presbyterian Mission of Korea
Costa Rican Evangelical Presbyterian Church
[[Iglesia Presbiteriana Reformada de Costa Rica]]

Cuba 
Reformed Presbyterian Church in Cuba
Christian Reformed Church in Cuba
Iglesia Episcopal Reformada de Cuba

El Salvador 
Christian Reformed Church in El Salvador
Reformed Calvinist Church of El Salvador
Evangelical and Reformed Church in El Salvador

Guatemala 
National Evangelical Presbyterian Church of Guatemala
Independent Fundamental Presbyterian Church
Bethlehem Bible Presbyterian Church
Presbyterian Synod of Southwest Guatemala
Reformed Church in Guatemala
Saint John Apostle Evangelical Church in Guatemala

Haiti 
Christian Reformed Church in Haiti
Reformed Presbyterian Church in Haiti

Dominican Republic 
Iglesia Bíblica del Señor Jesucristo
Christian Reformed Church of the Dominican Republic
Dominican Evangelical Church
 Reformed church of the Dominican Republic
 Grace Reformed Bible Church - Pastor Willy Bayonet.

Grenada 

Presbyterian Church in Grenada

Guadalupe 
Reformed Church in the Antilles

Honduras 
Christian Reformed Church in Honduras
Evangelical and Reformed Church in Honduras
Presbyterian Church in Honduras

Jamaica 
Protestant Reformed Churches of Jamaica
United Church in Jamaica and the Cayman Islands

Mexico 
Associate Reformed Presbyterian Church of Mexico
Christian Congregational Churches in Mexico
Independent Presbyterian Church in Mexico
 Mexican Communion of Reformed and Presbyterian Churches
National Conservative Presbyterian Church in Mexico
National Presbyterian Church in Mexico
Presbyterian Reformed Church of Mexico

Nicaragua 
Christian Reformed Church in Nicaragua

Panama 
Presbyterian Church of Panama - founded on April 4, 2012 - (mission of Presbyterian Church of Brazil)

Puerto Rico 
Christian Reformed Church in Puerto Rico
United Evangelical Church in Puerto Rico
Synod of Boriquen of the PC(USA)
Orthodox Presbyterian Church

Trinidad and Tobago 
Presbyterian Church in Trinidad and Tobago
Reformed Bible Churches in Trinidad and Tobago

South America

Argentina 
Iglesia Cristiana Evangélica Reformada Húngara (Hungarian Christian Evangelical Reformed Church)
Iglesia Evangélica Congregacional Argentina (Evangelical Congregational Church in Argentina)
Iglesia Evangélica del Rio de la Plata Evangelical Church of the River Plate - union of Lutherans and Reformed, mostly from German ancestry. European counterpart: Evangelical Church in Germany
Iglesia Evangelica Presbiteriana Coreana (Korean Evangelical Presbyterian Church)
Iglesia Evangelica Suiza en la Argentina (Swiss Evangelical Church)
Iglesia Evangélica Valdense en Argentina (Evangelical Waldensian Church of Argentina)
Iglesia Presbiteriana San Andrés (St. Andrew's Presbyterian Church (denomination)) - founded by missionaries and immigrants of the Church of Scotland, currently is a presbytery with fraternal relations with the U.S. Evangelical Presbyterian Church
Iglesias Reformadas en la Argentina Reformed Churches in Argentina - founded by German, Dutch and Welsh reformed immigrants
Congregational Churches in Argentina https://www.internationalcongregationalfellowship.org/our-regions/

Bolivia 
Evangelical Presbyterian Church in Bolivia - Iglesia Evangélica Presbiteriana en Bolivia (Korean Mission)
Iglesia Evangelica Presbiteriana en Bolivia-Cochabamba (Korean Mission)
Bible Presbyterian church in Bolivia - Iglesia Presbiteriana Biblica (Chilean Mission)
Iglesia Presbiteriana de Bolivia (Brazilian Mission) - Presbyterian Church in Bolivia
Iglesia Presbiteriana en Bolivia (Bolivian initiative)
 Independent Presbyterian Church of Bolivia (Brazilian Mission) (Independent Presbyterian Church of Brazil)

Brazil

Reformed churches 
Igreja Anglicana Reformada
Antioch Presbyterian Church
Arab Evangelical Church of São Paulo
Christian Reformed Church of Campo Belo/Swiss Evangelical Church of São Paulo - Igreja Evangélica Suica de Sao Paulo
Comunhao Reformada Batista no Brasil
Christian Reformed Church in Brazil - Hungarian
Dutch Reformed Church in Brazil
Reformed Churches in Brazil - Igrejas Reformadas do Brasil
Evangelical Reformed Churches in Brazil - Igrejas Evangelicas Reformadas no Brasil

Presbyterian Churches 
Presbyterian Church of Brazil - Igreja Presbiteriana do Brasil
Independent Presbyterian Church of Brazil - Igreja Presbiteriana Independente do Brasil
United Presbyterian Church of Brazil - Igreja Presbiteriana Unida do Brasil
Conservative Presbyterian Church in Brazil - Igreja Presbiteriana Conservadora do Brasil
Renewed Presbyterian Church in Brazil - Igreja Presbiteriana Renovada do Brasil
Fundamentalist Presbyterian Church in Brazil - Igreja Presbiteriana Fundamentalista do Brasil
Traditional Presbyterian Church in Brazil - Igreja Presbiteriana Tradicional do Brasil
Korean Presbyterian Church of Brazil - Igreja Presbiteriana Coreana do Brasil
Cumberland Presbyterian Church in Bahia - Igreja Presbiteriana Cumberland da Bahia
Christian Evangelical Presbyterian Church in Brazil - Igreja Evangélica Crista Presbiteriana
Chinese Presbyterian Church in Brazil
Free Presbyterian Church in Brazil
Reformed Presbyterian Church of Brazil
Igrja Presbiteriana Avidada

Congregational churches 
Evangelical Congregational Church in Brazil - Igrejas Evangelicas Congregacionnais do Brasil
Christian Evangelical Church in Brazil
Union of Evangelical Congregational Churches in Brazil - Uniao das Igrejas Evangelicas Congregaciais do Brasil
Aliança das Igrejas Evangélicas Congregacionais Brasileiras
Igreja Congregacional Bíblica
Igrejas Congregacionais Conservadoras
Igreja Kalleyana - Igreja Puritana Reformada no Brasil
Igrejas que militam na Obra da Restauração de Tudo - OPIMOBRART

Chile 
Christian Presbyterian Church of Chile
Evangelical Presbyterian Church in Chile
Presbyterian Church in Chile
Biblical Fundamentalist Presbyterian Church in Chile
Presbyterian Church in America, Chile
National Presbyterian Church in Chile
Korean Presbyterian Church of Chile
Korean United Church of Chile
Reformed Presbyterian Church in Chile (mission of Reformed Presbyterian Church of North America)

Colombia 
Evangelical Reformed Church of Colombia
Cumberland Presbyterian Church in Colombia
Presbyterian Church of Colombia (Reformed Synod) - Iglesia Presbiteriana de Colombia (Sinodo Reformado)
Presbyterian Church of Colombia (Presbyterian Synod) - Iglesia Presbiteriana de Colombia (Synodo Presbiteriano)
United Church of Christ (Colombia)
Reformed Church of Latin America
Presbyterian Church of the Reformation of Colombia

Ecuador 
Iglesia Evangelica Unida del Ecuador
Presbyterian Reformed Church of Ecuador (Iglesia Reformada Presbiteriana del Ecuador) - Mission of Presbyterian Church in America

French Guiana 
Eglise Evangelique de la Guyane francaise - French Reformed Church in French Guiana

Guyana 
Guyana Congregational Union
Guyana Presbyterian Church - Canadian mission
Presbyterian Church of Guyana - Scottish mission

Paraguay 
Presbyterian Church in Paraguay - Iglesia Presbiteriana en el Paraguay - Mission of the Bazilian Presbyterian Church
Taiwanese Presbyterian Church in Asuncion - Iglesia Presbiteriana Taiwanesa en Asuncion- Taiwanese Presbyterian mission
Korean United Church in Paraguay - Missao Coreana en el Paraguay - Korean Presbyterian missions
Evangelical Congregational Churches in Paraguay - Iglesias Evangelicas Congregacionalistas en el Paraguay - German Reformed
Hope Reformed Presbyterian Church
Reformed Presbyterian Church in Paraguay - Korean mission

Peru 
Evangelical Church of Peru - Iglesia Evangelica Peruana
Evangelical Presbyterian and Reformed Church in Peru, union of Evangelical Presbyterian Church of Peru (Scottish Free Presbyterian mission) and National Presbyterian Church of Peru (Bible Presbyterian Church mission).

Suriname 
Hervormde Kerk van Suriname - Dutch Reformed Church of Suriname

Uruguay 
Presbyterian Church of Uruguay (mission of Presbyterian Church of Brazil)
Iglesia Evangelica Reformada Uruguayo-Hungara
Iglesia Evangelica Valdense de Rio de la Plata

Venezuela 
Iglesia Presbiteriana de Venezuela - Presbyterian Church of Venezuela
Reformed Church in Venezuela
Presbyterian Church El Redentor

Middle East

Israel 
St Andrews Scots Memorial Church
Baraka Bible Presbyterian Church
Nes Amin Christian Settlement

Syria 
Armenian Evangelical Church

Lebanon 
Union of the Armenian Evangelical Churches in the Near East
National Evangelical Church Union of Lebanon
National Evangelical Synod of Syria and Lebanon

Iran 
Synod of the Evangelical Church of Iran
Evangelical Presbyterian Church of Iran

Iraq 
Evangelical Church in Iraq

See also

List of Christian denominations#Reformed Churches
Presbyterianism
List of Reformed Baptist Churches
Individual church congregations
List of Congregational churches
List of Presbyterian churches
International organizations
International Conference of Reformed Churches
Reformed Ecumenical Council
World Alliance of Reformed Churches
World Reformed Fellowship
World Communion of Reformed Churches

References

External links
Reformed Online
Reformed Reader